This is a list of the Australian species of the family Copromorphidae. It also acts as an index to the species articles and forms part of the full List of moths of Australia.

Copromorpha lichenitis (Turner, 1916)
Copromorpha phaeosticta (Turner, 1916)
Osidryas chersodes (Turner, 1913)
Osidryas phyllodes Meyrick, 1916
Phycomorpha prasinochroa (Meyrick, 1906)
Schistocyttara nebulosa Turner, 1942
Tanymecica xanthoplaca Turner, 1916

External links 
Copromorphidae at Australian Faunal Directory

Australia